Thomas Lockie (13 January 1906 – 27 July 1977) was a Scottish footballer and manager.

Lockie played for Duns, Rangers, Leith Athletic, Barnsley, York City, Accrington Stanley and Mansfield Town.

He returned to York City in 1936 as reserve team coach and was promoted to first team trainer in 1937. He held this role for 23 years until becoming the manager in 1960, which he held until 1967.

Managerial statistics

References

External links

1906 births
People from Duns, Scottish Borders
1977 deaths
Scottish footballers
Association football central defenders
Duns F.C. players
Rangers F.C. players
Leith Athletic F.C. players
Barnsley F.C. players
York City F.C. players
Accrington Stanley F.C. (1891) players
Mansfield Town F.C. players
English Football League players
Scottish football managers
York City F.C. managers
English Football League managers
York City F.C. non-playing staff
Sportspeople from the Scottish Borders